Alan Fox (10 July 1936 – 16 September 2021) was a Welsh professional footballer who played as a centre half.

Career
Born in Holywell, Fox played for Carmel United, Wrexham, Hartlepools United, Bradford City and Dundalk. He also played for Wales at under-23 level.

He died on 16 September 2021.

References

1936 births
2021 deaths
Welsh footballers
Association football central defenders
Wales under-23 international footballers
English Football League players
Wrexham A.F.C. players
Hartlepool United F.C. players
Bradford City A.F.C. players
Dundalk F.C. players
Welsh football managers
Dundalk F.C. managers
People from Holywell, Flintshire
Sportspeople from Flintshire